The French Defence is a chess opening characterised by the moves:

1. e4 e6

The French has a reputation for solidity and resilience, although some lines such as the Winawer Variation can lead to  complications.

Basics

Following the opening moves 1.e4 e6, the main line of the French Defence continues 2.d4 d5 (see below for alternatives). The same position can be reached by transposition from a Queen's Pawn Game after 1.d4 e6 2.e4 d5 or the declining of a Blackmar–Diemer Gambit after 1.d4 d5 2.e4 e6.

White's options include defending the e4-pawn with 3.Nc3 or 3.Nd2, advancing it with 3.e5, or exchanging it with 3.exd5, each of which leads to different types of positions.

General themes

The diagram shows a pawn structure commonly found in the French. Black has more space on the queenside, so tends to focus on that side of the board, almost always playing ...c7–c5 early on to attack White's pawn chain at its base, and may follow up by advancing his a- and b-pawns.

Alternatively or simultaneously, Black will play against White's centre, which is cramping his position. In the unlikely case that the flank attack ...c7–c5 is insufficient to achieve counterplay, Black can also try ...f7–f6. In many positions, White may support the pawn on e5 by playing f2–f4, with ideas of f4–f5, but the primary drawback to the advance of the f-pawn is opening of the g1–a7 diagonal, which is particularly significant due to the black queen's oft-found position on b6 and the heavy pressure on d4. In addition, many French Advance lines do not provide White with the time to play f2–f4 as it does not support the heavily pressured d4-pawn. For instance, 1.e4 e6 2.d4 d5 3.e5 c5 4.c3 Nc6 5.f4? (if White plays Nf3, f4 will come much slower) 5...Qb6 6.Nf3 Nh6! and the knight will go to f5 to place fatal pressure on d4 and dxc5 will never be an option as the white king would be stuck in the centre of the board after ...Bxc5.

White tries to do this in the Alekhine–Chatard Attack, for example. Another example is the following line of the Classical French: 1.e4 e6 2.d4 d5 3.Nc3 Nf6 4.Bg5 Be7 5.e5 Nfd7 6.Bxe7 Qxe7 7.f4 0-0 8.Nf3 c5 9.Bd3 (diagram). White's  eyes the weak h7-pawn, which is usually defended by a knight on f6, but here it has been pushed away by e5. If 9...cxd4 (Black does better with 9...f5 or 9...f6), White can play the Greek gift sacrifice 10.Bxh7+ Kxh7 11.Ng5+ Qxg5 12.fxg5 dxc3 13.Qh5+! where Black has three minor pieces for the queen, which gives him a slight material superiority, but his king is vulnerable and White has good attacking chances.

Apart from a piece attack, White may play for the advance of his kingside pawns (an especially common idea in the endgame), which usually involves f2–f4, g2–g4 and then f4–f5 to use his natural spatial advantage on that side of the board. A white pawn on f5 can be very strong as it may threaten to capture on e6 or advance to f6. Sometimes  the h-pawn to h5 or h6 may also be effective. A modern idea is for White to gain space on the queenside by playing a2–a3 and b2–b4. If implemented successfully, this will further restrict Black's pieces.

One of the drawbacks of the French Defence for Black is his , which is blocked in by his pawn on e6 and can remain passive throughout the game. An often-cited example of the potential weakness of this bishop is S. Tarrasch–R. Teichmann, San Sebastián 1912, in which the diagrammed position was reached after fifteen moves of a Classical French.

Black's position is passive because his light-square bishop is hemmed in by pawns on a6, b5, d5, e6 and f7. White will probably try to exchange Black's knight, which is the only one of his pieces that has any scope. Although it might be possible for Black to hold on for a draw, it is not easy and, barring any mistakes by White, Black will have few chances to create counterplay; this is why, for many years, the classical lines fell out of favour, and 3...Bb4 began to be seen more frequently after World War I, owing to the efforts of Nimzowitsch and Botvinnik. In Tarrasch–Teichmann, White won after 41 moves. In order to avoid this fate, Black usually makes it a priority early in the game to find a useful post for the bishop. Black can play ...Bd7–a4 to attack a pawn on c2, which occurs in many lines of the Winawer Variation. If Black's f-pawn has moved to f6, then Black may also consider bringing the bishop to g6 or h5 via d7 and e8. If White's light-square bishop is on the f1–a6 diagonal, Black can try to exchange it by playing ...b6 and ...Ba6, or ...Qb6 followed by ...Bd7–b5.

Main line: 2.d4 d5

3.Nc3
Played in over 40% of all games after 1.e4 e6 2.d4 d5, 3.Nc3 is the most commonly seen line against the French. Black has three main options, 3...Bb4 (the Winawer Variation), 3...Nf6 (the Classical Variation), and 3...dxe4 (the Rubinstein Variation). An eccentric idea is 3...Nc6 4.Nf3 Nf6 with the idea of 5.e5 Ne4; German IM Helmut Reefschlaeger has been fond of this move.

Winawer Variation: 3...Bb4 
This variation, named after Szymon Winawer and pioneered by Nimzowitsch and Botvinnik, is one of the main systems in the French, due chiefly to the latter's efforts in the 1940s, becoming the most often seen rejoinder to 3.Nc3, though in the 1980s, the Classical Variation with 3...Nf6 began a revival, and has since become more popular.

3...Bb4 pins the knight on c3, forcing White to resolve the central tension. White normally clarifies the central situation for the moment with 4.e5, gaining space and hoping to show that Black's b4-bishop is misplaced. The main line then is: 4...c5 5.a3 Bxc3+ 6.bxc3, resulting in the diagrammed position.

While White has doubled pawns on the queenside, which form the basis for Black's counterplay, they can also help White since they strengthen his centre and give him a semi-open b-file. White has a spatial advantage on the kingside, where Black is even weaker than usual because he has traded off his . Combined with the bishop pair, this gives White attacking chances, which he must attempt to use as the long-term features of this pawn structure favour Black.

In the diagrammed position, Black most frequently plays 6...Ne7 (The main alternative is 6...Qc7, which can simply transpose to main lines after 7.Qg4 Ne7, but Black also has the option of 7.Qg4 f5 or ...f6. 6...Qa5 has recently become a popular alternative). Now White can exploit the absence of Black's dark-square bishop by playing 7.Qg4, giving Black two choices: he may sacrifice his kingside pawns with 7...Qc7 8.Qxg7 Rg8 9.Qxh7 cxd4 but destroy White's centre in return, the so-called "Poisoned Pawn Variation"; or he can play 7...0-0 8.Bd3 Nbc6, which avoids giving up material, but leaves the king on the flank where White is trying to attack. A more recent alternative is 7...Kf8, which tries to make use of the locked pawn centre (the king is safe from central attacks, and can run away from a kingside attack). Experts on the 7.Qg4 line include Judit Polgár.

If the tactical complications of 7.Qg4 are not to White's taste, 7.Nf3 and 7.a4 are good positional alternatives, and 7.h4 is a more aggressive attempt:

7.Nf3 is a natural developing move, and White usually follows it up by developing the king's bishop to d3 or e2 (occasionally to b5) and castling kingside. This is called the Winawer Advance Variation. This line often continues 7...Bd7 8.Bd3 c4 9.Be2 Ba4 10.0-0 Qa5 11.Bd2 Nbc6 12.Ng5 h6 13.Nh3 0-0-0. Its assessment is unclear, but most likely Black would be considered "comfortable" here.

The purpose behind 7.a4 is threefold: it prepares Bc1–a3, taking advantage of the absence of Black's dark-square bishop. It also prevents Black from playing ...Qa5–a4 or ...Bd7–a4 attacking c2, and if Black plays ...b6 (followed by ...Ba6 to trade off the bad bishop), White may play a5 to attack the b6-pawn. World Champions Vasily Smyslov and Bobby Fischer both used this line with success.

White also has 7.h4, which has the ideas of either pushing this pawn to h6 to cause more dark-square weaknesses in the Black kingside (if Black meets h5 with ...h6, White can play g4–g5), or getting the rook into the game via Rh3–g3.

Black can also gain attacking chances in most lines: against 7.Qg4, Black will attack White's king in the centre; whereas against the other lines, Black can often gain an attack with ...0-0-0, normally combined with ...c4 to close the queenside, and then ...f6 to open up the kingside, where White's king often resides. If Black can accomplish this, White is often left without meaningful play, although ...c4 does permit White a4 followed by Ba3 if Black has not stopped this by placing a piece on a4 (for example, by Bd7–a4).

Sidelines
5th-move deviations for White include:
 5.Qg4
 5.dxc5
 5.Nf3
 5.Bd2

4th-move deviations for White include:
 4.exd5 exd5, transposing to a line of the Exchange Variation, where White may aim to prove that Black's bishop on b4 is misplaced.
 4.Ne2 (the Alekhine Gambit) 4...dxe4 5.a3 Be7 (5...Bxc3+ is necessary if Black wants to try to hold the pawn) 6.Nxe4 to prevent Black from doubling his pawns.
 4.Bd3 defending e4.
 4.a3 Bxc3+ 5.bxc3 dxe4 6.Qg4, another attempt to exploit Black's weakness on g7.
 4.e5 c5 5.Bd2, again preventing the doubled pawns and making possible 6.Nb5, where the knight may hop into d6 or simply defend d4.
 4.Bd2 (an old move sometimes played by Rashid Nezhmetdinov, notably against Mikhail Tal)

Deviations for Black include:
 4...Ne7 although this move usually transposes to the main line.
 4...b6 followed by ...Ba6, or 4...Qd7 with the idea of meeting 5.Qg4 with 5...f5. However, theory currently prefers White's chances in both lines.
 Another popular way for Black to deviate is 4.e5 c5 5.a3 Ba5, the Armenian Variation, as its theory and practice have been much enriched by players from that country, the most notable of whom is Rafael Vaganian. Black maintains the pin on the knight, which White usually tries to break by playing 6.b4 cxb4 7.Qg4 or 7.Nb5 (usually 7.Nb5 bxa3+ 8.c3 Bc7 9.Bxa3 and White has the upper hand).

Classical Variation: 3...Nf6 
This is another major system in the French. White can continue with the following options:

4.Bg5

White threatens 5.e5, attacking the pinned knight. Black has a number of ways to meet this threat.

Burn Variation: 4...dxe4 
Named after Amos Burn, the Burn Variation is the most common reply at the top level. 4...dxe4 5.Nxe4 and usually there now follows: 5...Be7 6.Bxf6 Bxf6 7.Nf3 Nd7 or 7...0-0, resulting in a position resembling those arising from the Rubinstein Variation. However, here Black has the bishop pair, with greater dynamic chances (although White's knight is well placed on e4), so this line is more popular than the Rubinstein and has long been a favourite of Evgeny Bareev. Black can also try 5...Be7 6.Bxf6 gxf6, as played by Alexander Morozevich and Gregory Kaidanov; by following up with ...f5 and ...Bf6, Black obtains active piece play in return for his shattered pawn structure. Another line that resembles the Rubinstein is 5...Nbd7 6.Nf3 Be7 (6...h6 is also tried) 7.Nxf6+ Bxf6.

4...Be7 5.e5 Nfd7

 4...Be7 5.e5 Nfd7 used to be the main line and remains important, even though the Burn Variation has overtaken it in popularity. The usual continuation is 6.Bxe7 Qxe7 7.f4 0-0 (not 7...c5? 8.Nb5!) 8.Nf3 c5, when White has a number of options, including 9.Bd3, 9.Qd2 and 9.dxc5.
 An alternative for White is the gambit 6.h4, which was devised by Adolf Albin and played by Chatard, but not taken seriously until the game Alekhine–Fahrni, Mannheim 1914. It is known today as the Albin–Chatard Attack or the Alekhine–Chatard Attack. After 6...Bxg5 7.hxg5 Qxg5 8.Nh3 Qe7 9.Qg4 g6 10.Ng5 (the reason for 8.Nh3 rather than 8.Nf3 is to play Qg4), White has sacrificed a pawn to keep the black king in the centre, as castling neither queenside nor kingside appears safe. Another point of the gambit is that Black's natural French Defence move 6...c5 runs into 7.Bxe7 when Black must either move the king with 7...Kxe7 or allow 7...Qxe7 8.Nb5! with a dual threat of Nc7+, winning the rook on a8, and Nd6+, when Black's king must move and the knight is very strong on d6. Black may decline the gambit in several ways such as 6... a6 and 6... h6. After 6...a6, White can continue to play for an attack with the aggressive 7.Qg4! threatening Bxe7 and then Qxg7. Black is forced to eliminate the bishop with 7...Bxg5 8.hxg5, opening up the h-file. A wild game with unsafe kings is sure to ensue. 6...h6 is a safer declination of the sacrifice, forcing the bishop to trade with 7.Bxe7 Qxe7 after which White may continue to try to attack on the kingside in anticipation of Black castling kingside (since queenside castling is undesirable due to the need for c5) with 8.f4 a6 9.g4 with a menacing attack.

McCutcheon Variation: 4...Bb4 
 A third choice for Black is to counterattack with the McCutcheon Variation. In this variation, the second player ignores White's threat of e4–e5 and instead plays 4...Bb4. The main line continues: 5.e5 h6 6.Bd2 Bxc3 7.bxc3 Ne4 8.Qg4. At this point Black may play 8...g6, which weakens the kingside dark squares but keeps the option of castling queenside, or 8...Kf8. An alternative way White can treat 5...h6 is to carry through with the threat with 6.exf6 hxg5 7.fxg7 Rg8. The McCutcheon Variation is named for John Lindsay McCutcheon of Philadelphia (1857–1905), who brought the variation to public attention when he used it to defeat World Champion Steinitz in a simultaneous exhibition in Manhattan in 1885.

Steinitz Variation: 4.e5 

Named after Wilhelm Steinitz, the Steinitz Variation continues with 4.e5 Nfd7. Here 5.Nce2, the Shirov–Anand Variation, prepares to bolster the white pawn centre with c2–c3 and f2–f4; while 5.Nf3 transposes to a position also reached via the Two Knights Variation (2.Nf3 d5 3.Nc3 Nf6 4.e5 Nfd7 5.d4). The main line of the Steinitz is 5.f4 c5 6.Nf3 Nc6 7.Be3. (Instead 7.Ne2 transposes to the Shirov–Anand Variation, while 7.Be2 cxd4 8.Nxd4 Ndxe5! 9.fxe5 Qh4+ wins a pawn for Black.) Here Black may step up the pressure on d4 by playing 7...Qb6 or 7...cxd4 8.Nxd4 Qb6, begin queenside play with 7...a6 8.Qd2 b5, or continue kingside development by playing 7...Be7 or 7...cxd4 8.Nxd4 Bc5. In these lines, White has the option of playing either Qd2 and 0-0-0, or Be2 and 0-0, with the former typically leading to  positions due to opposite-side castling when Black castles kingside in both cases.

Rubinstein Variation: 3...dxe4 

This variation is named after Akiba Rubinstein and can also arise from a different move order: 3.Nd2 dxe4. White has freer development and more space in the centre, which Black intends to neutralise by playing ...c7–c5 at some point. This solid line has undergone a modest revival, featuring in many grandmaster (GM) games as a drawing weapon but theory still gives White a slight edge. After 3...dxe4 4.Nxe4, Black has the following options:
 The most popular line is: 4...Nd7 5.Nf3 Ngf6 6.Nxf6+ Nxf6 when Black is ready for ...c5.
 4...Bd7 5.Nf3 Bc6 (the Fort Knox Variation) activating the light-square bishop, which is often played by Alexander Rustemov.

Hecht Reefschlager Variation: 3...Nc6  
3...Nc6 is the Hecht Reefschlager Variation, a name coined by John Watson. This sideline has been played by Aron Nimzowitsch and many other players.

Rare sidelines after 3.Nc3 
One rare sideline after 3.Nc3 is 3...c6, which is known as the Paulsen Variation, after Louis Paulsen. It can also be reached via a Caro–Kann Defence move order (1.e4 c6 2.d4 d5 3.Nc3 e6).

Tarrasch Variation: 3.Nd2 

The Tarrasch Variation is named after Siegbert Tarrasch. This move became particularly popular during the 1970s and early 1980s when Anatoly Karpov used it to great effect. Though less aggressive than the alternate 3.Nc3, it is still used by top-level players seeking a small, safe advantage.

Like 3.Nc3, 3.Nd2 protects e4, but is different in several key respects: it does not block White's c-pawn from advancing, which means he can play c3 at some point to support his d4-pawn. Hence, it avoids the Winawer Variation as 3...Bb4 is now readily answered by 4.c3. On the other hand, 3.Nd2 develops the knight to an arguably less active square than 3.Nc3, and in addition, it hems in White's dark-square bishop. Hence, White will typically have to spend an extra tempo moving the knight from d2 at some point before developing said bishop.

 3...c5 4.exd5 and now Black has two ways to recapture:
 4...exd5 was a staple of many old Karpov–Korchnoi battles, including seven games in their 1974 match. It usually leads to Black having an isolated queen's pawn (see isolated pawn). The main line continues 5.Ngf3 Nc6 6.Bb5 Bd6 7.0-0 Nge7 8.dxc5 Bxc5 9.Nb3 Bb6 with a position where, if White can neutralise the activity of Black's pieces in the middlegame, he will have a slight advantage in the ending. Another possibility for White is 5.Bb5+ Bd7 (5...Nc6 is also possible) 6.Qe2+ Be7 7.dxc5 to trade off the bishops and make it more difficult for Black to regain the pawn.
 4...Qxd5 is an important alternative for Black; the idea is to trade his c- and d-pawns for White's d- and e-pawns, leaving Black with an extra centre pawn. This constitutes a slight structural advantage, but in return White gains time for development by harassing Black's queen. This interplay of static and dynamic advantages is the reason why this line has become popular in the last decade. Play usually continues 5.Ngf3 cxd4 6.Bc4 Qd6 7.0-0 Nf6 (preventing 8.Ne4) 8.Nb3 Nc6 9.Nbxd4 Nxd4, and here White may stay in the middlegame with 10.Nxd4 or offer the trade of queens with 10.Qxd4, with the former far more commonly played today.
 3...Nf6 While the objective of 3...c5 was to break open the centre, 3... Nf6 aims to close it. After 4.e5 Nfd7 5.Bd3 c5 6.c3 Nc6 (6...b6 intends ...Ba6 next to get rid of Black's "bad" light-square bishop, a recurring idea in the French) 7.Ne2 (leaving f3 open for the queen's knight) 7...cxd4 8.cxd4 f6 9.exf6 Nxf6 10.Nf3 Bd6 Black has freed his pieces at the cost of having a backward pawn on e6. White may also choose to preserve his pawn on e5 by playing 4.e5 Nfd7 5.c3 c5 6.f4 Nc6 7.Ndf3, but his development is slowed as a result, and Black will gain dynamic chances if he can open the position to advantage.
 3...Nc6 is known as the Guimard Variation: after 4.Ngf3 Nf6 5.e5 Nd7 Black will exchange White's cramping e-pawn next move by ...f6. However, Black does not exert any pressure on d4 because he cannot play ...c5, so White should maintain a slight advantage, with 6.Be2 or 6 Nb3.
 3...Be7 is known as the Morozevich Variation. A fashionable line among top GMs in recent years, this odd-looking move aims to prove that every White move now has its drawbacks, e.g. after 4.Ngf3 Nf6 5.e5 Nfd7 White cannot play f4, whereas 4.Bd3 c5 5.dxc5 Nf6 and 4.e5 c5 5. Qg4 Kf8!? lead to obscure complications. 3...h6, with a similar rationale, has also gained some adventurous followers in recent years, including GM Alexander Morozevich.
 Another rare line is 3...a6, which gained some popularity in the 1970s. Similar to 3...Be7, the idea is to play a waiting move to make White declare his intentions before Black commits to a plan of his own. 3...a6 also controls the b5-square, which is typically useful for Black in most French lines because, for example, White no longer has the option of playing Bb5.

Advance Variation: 3.e5 

The main line of the Advance Variation continues 3...c5 4.c3 Nc6 5.Nf3 and then we have a branching point:
 
 5...Qb6, the idea is to increase the pressure on d4 and eventually undermine the white centre. The queen also attacks the b2-square, so White's dark-square bishop cannot easily defend the d4-pawn without losing the b2-pawn. White's most common replies are 6.a3, 6.Be2 and 6.Bd3.
 6.a3 is currently the most important line in the Advance: it prepares 7.b4, gaining space on the queenside. Black may prevent this with 6...c4 intending to take en passant if White plays b4, which creates a closed game where Black fights for control of the b3-square. A possible line is 6.a3 c4 7.Nbd2 Na5 8.Rb1 Bd7 and Black has a firm grip on b3 square. Alternatively, Black may continue developing with 6...Nh6, intending ...Nf5, which might seem strange as White can double the pawn with Bxh6, but this is actually considered good for Black. Black plays ...Bg7 and ...0-0 and Black's king has adequate defence and White will miss his apparently 'bad' dark-square bishop.
 6.Be2 is the other alternative, aiming simply to castle. Once again, a common Black response is 6...Nh6 intending 7...cxd4 8.cxd4 Nf5 attacking d4. White usually responds to this threat with 7.Bxh6 or 7.b3 preparing Bb2.
 6.Bd3 cxd4 7.cxd4 Bd7 (7...Nxd4 8.Nxd4 Qxd4 9.Bb5+) 8.0-0 Nxd4 9.Nxd4 Qxd4 10.Nc3 is the Milner-Barry Gambit. If Black continues 10...Qxe5, White gains an attack with 11.Re1 Qb8 12.Nxd5 or 11...Qd6 12.Nb5.
 5...Bd7 was mentioned by Greco as early as 1620. It is known as the Euwe Variation and was popularised by Viktor Korchnoi in the 1970s. Now a main line, the idea behind the move is that since Black usually plays ...Bd7 eventually, he plays it at once and waits for White to show his hand. If White continues 6.a3, modern theory says that Black at least equalises after 6...f6! The lines are complex, but the main point is that a3 is a wasted move if the black queen is not on b6 and so Black uses the extra tempo to attack White's centre immediately. Common continuations after 5...Bd7 are 6.Be2 or 6.dxc5 (6.Bb5? is immediately refuted by 6...Nxe5).
 5...Nh6 has recently become a popular alternative; the idea is that 6.Bxh6 gxh6 gains Black a semi-open g-file to attack the White king, or Black can play ...Bg7 to support ...f6 to attack White's pawn on e5. If White doesn't take the knight, it will move to f5 to pressure d4, or (after ...f6) to f7 to pressure e5.

There are alternative strategies to 3...c5 that were tried in the early 20th century such as 3...b6, intending to fianchetto the bad bishop and which can transpose to Owen's Defence. Also possible is 4...Qb6 5.Nf3 Bd7 intending 6...Bb5 to trade off the "bad" queen's bishop. Playing 3...Nc6 is a misguided attempt to reach the Hecht Reefschlager Variation or the Guimard Variation.

Exchange Variation: 3.exd5 

Many players who begin with 1.e4 find that the French Defence is the most difficult opening for them to play against due to the closed structure and unique strategies of the system. Thus, many players choose to play the Exchange so that the position becomes simpler and more clearcut. White makes no effort to exploit the advantage of the first move, and has often chosen this line with expectation of an early draw, and indeed draws often occur if neither side breaks the symmetry. An extreme example was Capablanca–Maróczy, Lake Hopatcong 1926, which went: 4.Bd3 Bd6 5.Nf3 Nf6 6.0-0 0-0 7.Bg5 Bg4 8.Re1 Nbd7 9.Nbd2 c6 10.c3 Qc7 11.Qc2 Rfe8 12.Bh4 Bh5 13.Bg3 Bxg3 14.hxg3 Bg6 15.Rxe8+ Rxe8 16.Bxg6 hxg6 17.Re1 Rxe1+ 18.Nxe1 Ne8 19.Nd3 Nd6 20.Qb3 a6 21.Kf1 .

Despite the symmetrical pawn structure, White cannot force a draw. An obsession with obtaining one sometimes results in embarrassment for White, as in Tatai–Korchnoi, Beer Sheva 1978, which continued 4.Bd3 c5!? 5.Nf3 Nc6 6.Qe2+ Be7 7.dxc5 Nf6 8.h3 0-0 9.0-0 Bxc5 10.c3 Re8 11.Qc2 Qd6 12.Nbd2 Qg3 13.Bf5 Re2 14.Nd4 Nxd4 . A less extreme example was Mikhail Gurevich–Nigel Short, Manila 1990 where White, a strong Russian grandmaster, played openly for the draw but was ground down by Short in 42 moves.

To create genuine winning chances, White will often play c2–c4 at some stage to put pressure on Black's d5-pawn. Black can give White an isolated queen's pawn by capturing on c4, but this gives White's pieces greater freedom, which may lead to attacking chances. This occurs in lines such as 3.exd5 exd5 4.c4 (played by GMs Normunds Miezis and Maurice Ashley) and 4.Nf3 Bd6 5.c4, which may transpose to the Petroff. Conversely, if White declines to do this, Black may play ...c7–c5 himself, e.g. 4.Bd3 c5, as in the above-cited Tatai–Korchnoi game.

If c2–c4 is not played, White and Black have two main piece setups. White may put his pieces on Nf3, Bd3, Bg5 (pinning the black knight), Nc3, Qd2 or the queen's knight can go to d2 instead and White can support the centre with c3 and perhaps play Qb3. Conversely, when the queen's knight is on c3, the king's knight may go to e2 when the enemy bishop and knight can be kept out of the key squares e4 and g4 by f3. The positions are so symmetrical that the options and strategies are the same for both sides.

Another way to unbalance the position is for White or Black to castle on opposite sides of the board. An example of this is the line 4.Bd3 Nc6 5.c3 Bd6 6.Nf3 Bg4 7.0-0 Nge7 8.Re1 Qd7 9.Nbd2 .

Early deviations for White
After 1.e4 e6, almost 90 percent of all games continue 2.d4 d5, but White can try other ideas.

 2.d3 is usually played with the idea of adopting a King's Indian Attack setup after 2...d5 3.Nd2. It has been used by many leading players over the years, including GMs Pal Benko, Bobby Fischer, Leonid Stein and Lev Psakhis. White will likely play Ngf3, g3, Bg2, 0-0, c3 and/or Re1 in some order on the next few moves. Black may combat this setup with 3...c5 followed by ...Nc6, ...Nf6, ...Be7, and ...0-0; developing the kingside by ...Bd6 and ...Nge7 is also playable.  3...Nf6 4.Ngf3 Nc6 plans ...dxe4 and ...e5 to block in the Bg2, and 3...Nf6 4.Ngf3 b6 makes ...Ba6 possible if White's light-square bishop leaves the a6–f1 diagonal.  Black may defer ...d5, and play 2...c5 and 3...Nc6, developing the kingside by ...g6, ...Bg7, and ...Nge7, or less commonly, by ...Nf6, ...Be7, and (if White's knight goes to d2) ...d6.
 2.f4 is the Labourdonnais Variation, named after Louis-Charles Mahé de La Bourdonnais, the 19th-century French master. Play can continue 2...d5 3. e5 c5 4. Nf3 Nc6 5.c3 Nge7 6.Na3 Nf5.
 2.Qe2 is the Chigorin Variation, which discourages 2...d5 because after 3.exd5 the black pawn is pinned, meaning Black would need to recapture with the queen. Black usually replies 2...c5, after which play can resemble the 2.d3 variation or the Closed Variation of the Sicilian Defence.
 2.Nf3 d5 3.Nc3 is the Two Knights Variation: 3...d4 and 3...Nf6 are good replies for Black.
 2.c4 (attempting to discourage 2...d5 by Black) is the Steiner Variation. But Black can reply 2...d5 anyway, when after 3.cxd5 exd5 4.exd5 Nf6 the only way for White to hold on to his extra pawn on d5 is to play 5.Bb5+. Black gets good compensation in return for the pawn, however.
 2.Bb5 has occasionally been tried. Notably, Henry Bird defeated Max Fleissig with the variation during the Vienna 1873 chess tournament.
 2.b3 leads to the Réti Gambit after 2...d5 3.Bb2 dxe4, but Black can also decline it with 3...Nf6 4.e5 Nd7 with White going for f4 and Qg4 before putting the knight on f3.
 2.e5 the Steinitz Attack, offers no advantage to White after 2...d6; alternatively 2...d5 3.d4 transposes into the Advance Variation.

There are also a few rare continuations after 1.e4 e6 2.d4 d5, including 3.Bd3 (the Schlechter Variation), 3.Be3 (the Alapin Gambit), and 3.c4 (the Diemer–Duhm Gambit, which can also be reached via the Queen's Gambit Declined).

Early deviations for Black
Although 2...d5 is the most consistent move after 1.e4 e6 2.d4, Black occasionally plays other moves. Chief among them is 2...c5, the Franco-Benoni Defence, so-called because it features the ...c7–c5 push characteristic of the Benoni Defence. White may continue 3.d5, when play can transpose into the Benoni, though White has extra options since c2–c4 is not mandated. 3.Nf3, transposing into a normal Sicilian Defence, and 3.c3, transposing into a line of the Alapin Sicilian (usually arrived at after 1.e4 c5 2.c3 e6 3.d4) are also common. Play may also lead back to the French; for example, 1.e4 e6 2.d4 c5 3.c3 d5 4.e5 transposes into the Advance Variation. Another move is 2...b6, which transposes into Owen's Defence or the English Defence. Also possible is 2...f5, the Franco-Hiva Gambit, but this is regarded as dubious.

History
The French Defence is named after a match played by correspondence between the cities of London and Paris in 1834 (although earlier examples of games with the opening do exist). It was Jacques Chamouillet, one of the players of the Paris team, who persuaded the others to adopt this defence.

As a reply to 1.e4, the French Defence received relatively little attention in the nineteenth century compared to 1...e5. The first world chess champion Wilhelm Steinitz said "I have never in my life played the French Defence, which is the dullest of all openings".  In the early 20th century, Géza Maróczy was perhaps the first world-class player to make it his primary weapon against 1.e4. For a long time, it was the third most popular reply to 1.e4, behind only 1...c5 and 1...e5. However, according to the Mega Database 2007, in 2006, 1...e6 was second only to the Sicilian in popularity.

Historically important contributors to the theory of the defence include Mikhail Botvinnik, Viktor Korchnoi, Akiba Rubinstein, Aron Nimzowitsch, Tigran Petrosian, Lev Psakhis, Wolfgang Uhlmann and Rafael Vaganian. More recently, its leading practitioners include Evgeny Bareev, Alexey Dreev, Mikhail Gurevich, Alexander Khalifman, Smbat Lputian, Alexander Morozevich, Teimour Radjabov, Nigel Short, Gata Kamsky, and Yury Shulman.

The Exchange Variation was recommended by Howard Staunton in the 19th century, but has been in decline ever since. In the early 1990s, Garry Kasparov briefly experimented with it before switching to 3.Nc3. Black's game is made much easier as his queen's bishop has been liberated. It has the reputation of giving immediate  to Black due to the symmetrical pawn structure.

Like the Exchange, the Advance Variation was frequently played in the early days of the French Defence. Aron Nimzowitsch believed it to be White's best choice and enriched its theory with many ideas. The Advance declined in popularity, however, throughout most of the 20th century until it was revived in the 1980s by GM and prominent opening theoretician Evgeny Sveshnikov, who continued to be a leading expert in this line. In recent years, it has become nearly as popular as 3.Nd2; GM Alexander Grischuk has championed it successfully at the highest levels. It is also a popular choice at the club level due to the availability of a simple, straightforward plan involving attacking chances and extra space.

ECO codes
The Encyclopaedia of Chess Openings includes an alphanumeric classification system for openings that is widely used in chess literature. Codes C00 to C19 are the French Defence, broken up in the following way (all apart from C00 start with the moves 1.e4 e6 2.d4 d5):

C00 – 1.e4 e6 without 2.d4, or 2.d4 without 2...d5 (early deviations)
C01 – 2.d4 d5 (includes the Exchange Variation, 3.exd5)
C02 – 3.e5 (Advance Variation)
C03 – 3.Nd2 (includes 3...Be7; C03–C09 cover the Tarrasch Variation)
C04 – 3.Nd2 Nc6 (Guimard Variation)
C05 – 3.Nd2 Nf6
C06 – 3.Nd2 Nf6 4.e5 Nfd7 5.Bd3
C07 – 3.Nd2 c5 (includes 4.exd5 Qxd5)
C08 – 3.Nd2 c5 4.exd5 exd5
C09 – 3.Nd2 c5 4.exd5 exd5 5.Ngf3 Nc6
C10 – 3.Nc3 (includes the Rubinstein Variation, 3...dxe4)
C11 – 3.Nc3 Nf6 (includes the Steinitz Variation, 4.e5; C11–C14 cover the Classical Variation)
C12 – 3.Nc3 Nf6 4.Bg5 (includes the McCutcheon Variation, 4...Bb4)
C13 – 3.Nc3 Nf6 4.Bg5 dxe4 (Burn Variation)
C14 – 3.Nc3 Nf6 4.Bg5 Be7
C15 – 3.Nc3 Bb4 (C15–C19 cover the Winawer Variation)
C16 – 3.Nc3 Bb4 4.e5
C17 – 3.Nc3 Bb4 4.e5 c5
C18 – 3.Nc3 Bb4 4.e5 c5 5.a3 (includes the Armenian Variation, 5...Ba5)
C19 – 3.Nc3 Bb4 4 e5 c5 5.a3 Bxc3+ 6.bxc3 Ne7 7.Nf3 and 7.a4

See also
 List of chess openings
 List of chess openings named after places

References

Further reading

External links

 The Anatomy of the French Advance
“6 h4 in the French Defence” by Edward Winter

Chess openings
1834 in chess